Itanus or Itanos was a Greek city and port on the northeast coast of ancient Crete, on  the promontory which the Romans called Itanum, the neuter form of Itanus, Latin for Greek Itanos.<ref>Pliny the Elder, Natural History," Book IV, Chapter 12, "promontory of Itanum."</ref>
The base of the tripartite northeast promontory, today called Cape Sideros, is still called  Itanos or Itano in modern Greek.

Occupation of the promontory began as early as the Final Neolithic, according to the archaeology. The site of the city itself, however, became inhabited in the Geometric Period of the 8th century BC. This city flourished independently of other Cretan powers, playing a leading role in the trade of the region, even becoming, for a while, a protectorate of Ptolemaic Egypt. It became part of the Roman province of Crete, and later Christian buildings were erected. For unclear reasons it was abandoned in the 7th century AD after a life of about 1400 years. The location was lost. Archaeologists were able to locate it in the 19th century. Recently it has become a subject in ground-breaking technologies of sub-surface surveying.

Some of the ruins of the classical and early Christian city are now visible in the elevations around Itanos and Eremoupolis Beaches, in the modern municipal unit of Itanos, of Sitia municipality. The east akropolis of the city was on the headland between the two beaches. The beach shown as Eremoupolis could not have appeared then as it does now, but the details have not yet been investigated scientifically. Itanos Beach on the other side went 100 yards further inland and was the deep channel of the harbor. Apparently, however, the east akropolis was not high enough or isolated enough to be a defensible fort.

History
 Bronze Age and earlier
The toponym u-ta-no, and the corresponding adjective, u-ta-ni-jo, appears on Linear B tablets found in Knossos. However Itanos seems to be too far away from Knossos to be u-ta-no, and J. Bennet ruled out the possibility that any Linear B tablets found at Knossos referred directly to classical Itanos.

The Itanos promontory, today nearly deserted, has 55 Bronze Age and Final Neolithic sites. A Minoan site at Itanos seemed theoretically possible, and yet the survey uncovered no Minoan material on or around the site at all. Instead all the Minoan farms, dams and lookouts seemed centered around “the villa of Vai,” a major site. The volcanic explosion of Santorini with tsunami destroyed civilization on the promontory. Life at Vai went on in LMIII with a diminished capacity, yet the settlement disappeared altogether in the Early Iron Age, to be replaced by an Itanos newly placed close to the shore in the 8th century BC during the Geometric Period.

Geometric, archaic, and classical periods
Herodotean first mention
Herodotus is the first Greek historian we know who mentioned Itanus. According to him, the Therans, when founding Cyrene, were indebted for their knowledge of the Libyan coast to Corobius, a seller of purple at Itanus.

 Itanos and the geographers 
According to Stephanos of Byzantium, Itanos was founded by Itanos, son of Phoenix, or a bastard son of one of the Kouretes.

Coins of Itanus
Some of the coins of this city present the type of a woman terminating in the tail of a fish.

Hellenistic period
Ancient Itanus was one of the most powerful cities in Crete in Hellenistic times owing to geography and a flourishing trade. The city controlled a vast territory that stretched from Cape Samonio (Cape Sidero today) on the north tip of Crete to Cape Erythrae (Cape Goudouras) on the far-southeast tip of the island.

The importance of Itanos can be seen in the city's issuance of its own currency, as well as in many significant ruins. The capital of the greater regional power, Itanus had the temples of Asclepius, Athena, Tyche, and Zeus, and was a historic rival of both Praesus and Ierapetra (Ierapytna).

The Hellenistic inscriptions of Itanus

Many Greek inscriptions were found in situ; the most famous one, kept now in the monastery of Toplou, relates a decision by the Roman Senate about Itanos' conflicts and territorial disputes with the neighbor cities Praisos and Hierapytna.

 Archaeological site 

The archeological site of Itanos is open to the public. It is possible to see the ruins of structures, city walls and Christian churches.

 History of archaeological investigation 

British mission
In 1852 HMS Spitfire surveyed the coasts of Crete under the direction of Captain Thomas Abel Brimage Spratt, resulting in Admiralty Chart No. 2536b, eastern Crete, one of the first of the accurate maps (see below under Maps). It notes the location of Eremoupolis, which it suggests might be Arsinoe or Etera, two pseudo-ancient toponyms.

Writing of his travel experiences Spratt interprets Eremoupoli as “desert city,” because “wild and neglected,” identifying it with a name from a manuscript as Etera. He says that he saw “inscriptions, old churches, tombs, and ruins.” The ruins “extend over the hills and slopes which overlook two small bays.” He then proceeds to enumerate most of the ruins as they were found in the archaeological site: the city wall to the south, the two akropoleis, the buildings between them, the churches. He found and copied inscriptions. The monks of Toplou Monastery cued him as to where they were. These monks had exposed them in superficial digging and then had covered them up again.

Italian mission
For four years, 1884–1887, the Italian government financed a mission to central and eastern Crete under the direction of Domenico Comparetti, then minister of public instruction. He did not go himself, but sent a then student, Federico Halbherr, to take command. They were both epigraphists.

The Gortyn code had been turning up piecemeal at Gortyn. A number of other agencies were on-site. At first Halbherr worked with them to recover and restore the code, completing the task in 1884. He then carried the mission to eastern Crete, hiking over the terrain, looking for inscriptions. He reported in 1891: “These researches extended from the province of Rettimo … as far as the furthermost eastern part of the island, exploring as it were foot by foot the soil of about two-thirds of Crete, and carrying out the first real systematic excavations.” Toplou Monastery owned northeastern Crete. Halbherr discovered that the monks were removing inscriptions from Erimoupolis. Dissatisfied, he sought and received permission to examine them. He had read Spratt, who had also removed inscriptions from there and had turned them over to the Fitzwilliam Museum of Cambridge.

Halbherr happened to arrive at Toplou just as a fresh batch of inscriptions from Erimoupolis was being sorted. Of those known to be from that location and those that had been left in place he found five mentioning Itanos and the Itanoi: “Only in 1884 a large number of epigraphical monuments collected and copied by me, partly in situ, partly in the monastery of Toplu, whither they had been recently carried, have enabled the site of the ancient city of Itanos to be definitively identified with the ruins of Erimopolis, …. Admiral Spratt, … was not lucky enough to find a single one bearing the name of the ancient city; whereas at the present day … we possess five….” This statement is universally accepted as the archaeological identification of Itanos.

In a follow-up article Halbherr translates Erimoupolis as "deserted city" based on what appeared to be its fate. He was the first to perceive the city plan: "Two hills, of which the highest" (East Akropolis) " juts out into the sea ... form two centres, from which gradually arose ... the ancient city, which occupied the lower ground" (Habitation quarter). Like Spratt, he goes over the ruins, concentrating on the Necropolis, or cemetery, on a hill to the north, from which most of the inscriptions had come. The Italian mission ended in 1887. Now a respected archaeological peer in Crete, Halbherr went on to work for the Americans and British in other excavations of East Crete, but never came back to Itanos, although he did collaborate on the inscriptions.

French missions
The Cretan Insurrection of 1897 and subsequent intervention of the International Squadron with formation of interim non-Ottoman governments released the archaeologists from any requirement to seek or abide by Ottoman firmans (permissions). A competition for sites ensued. French troops had landed in Eastern Crete. The British Archaeological School had firmans for Goulas and Itanos. In 1898 J. Demargne of the French School of Archaeology occupied the two sites and demanded permission to excavate from the provisional government. The British, interested in other sites, such as Knossos, yielded gracefully to keep the peace. Demargne excavated the basilicas, or churches, of Itanos in 1899–1900. He was mainly interested in inscriptions, but before he could publish them, he grew ill, and in 1911 turned them over to A.J. Reinach. Meanwhile, the site lay as he had left it for 50 years.

By 1950 the concept of Minoan civilization had been developed from remains at Knossos and elsewhere. A new generation of archaeologists at the French School decided to investigate Itanos for the presence of Minoan remains, which would suggest that "a major bronze age site" had preceded the one in evidence. The evidence did not go in that direction: "... en 1950, ... Hubert Gallet de Santerre, André Dessenne et Jean Deshayes tentèrent en vain d’y découvrir un site majeur de l’Âge du Bronze." The JHS reported: "The remains on the ancient acropolis have suffered  very serious injury ... pottery ranging from Protogeometric to Hellenistic has come to light, but without clear stratification; ...." From the East Akropolis they proceeded to the Habitation Quarter: "In the lower town the remains of ancient habitation are covered by extensive construction of the Christian era ...." In a hurry now, because nothing they found would justify a second season, performing abbreviated excavation of the necropolis they thought they had located a single building they called the "Grand Tombeau." They did not return.

The collaborative missions
Previous archaeology had left many questions unresolved. In 1994 the Greek Archaeological Service, acting through its branch for East Crete, the 24th Ephoria (or Ephoreia, or Ephorate) of Prehistoric (or Prehistorical) and Classical Antiquities agreed with archaeological peers at the Ecole française d'Athènes and other institutions in Crete that what was needed was "un portrait le plus complet possible de l'histoire, de la topographie et de l'organisation spatiale de cette petite cité crétoise," to be acquired in "un programme de recherches archéologiques," further defined as "un projet scientifique interdisciplinaire" and "une collaboration internationale."

Itanos Archaeological Survey
The first part of the project, which began in 1994 as a collaboration between the Ephorate, the French School, and the Institute of Mediterranean Studies of Rethymno, is usually termed "The Itanos Archaeological Survey" (La prospection d’Itanos). The southern part of this range was already known to have been Minoan. The major site, Roussolakkos, an early version of Palaikastro, was studied by members of the British School at Athens.

The survey was conducted by the two main institutional collaborators from 1994 to 2005 inclusive (12 years). The work was actually performed  by an équipe ("team") of UMR 7041 of the CNRS, the French national research institute, which undertook a number of archaeological projects. The persons responsable (French for "in charge") were Alain Schnapp and Alain Duplouy. The final outcome of the survey was a virtual map of the surveyed area stored in what came to be known as The Itanos Archaeological Survey database, which was developed over the period and has been online since 2006 running on the servers of the French School. The database stores points (données, "data") on the map. One point is a numbered site containing one or more objects of archaeological interest, such as a wall, or a scatter of sherds. The information for a site includes description, date, etc. The database is searchable on a range of specifiable criteria.

The archaeological survey, 1994–2005, focused on remains discoverable on the surface. Also, a deliberate decision was made to ignore concentrations of sherds if there was no other surface manifestation. To locate sites the team turned to aerial photography, which was simplified by the previous existence of military fly-over photographs dating from 1945, 1966, 1968, and 1992. These were compared to 1:5000 maps in possession of the Institute. To supplement them another fly-over was staged in 2004 to capture oblique views.

Noting that the photographs were indicating a "diversity of soils and landscapes" the team thought it more efficient to divide the surveyable territory into 11 zones, which they named after topographic features, such as hills. The zones form a semi-circle around the walled city but do not include a central area comprising Vai Palm Forest and agricultural land west of the ancient city. Excluded from public access to the database are the two quasi-islands, Kyriamadi and Sideros, on the military reservation. Their being surveyed was assigned to the 24th Ephorate (another government agency). Whether or not they were surveyed and what might have been found there has not been released to the public, nor it is mentioned in the publications.

Ground teams decided what was to be considered a site, which must have an above-ground feature. It was then assigned a number. A decision was made to have the numbers run consecutively within the whole territory rather than within the zones. Assessments of the date and culture came from laboratory analysis of sherds collected at the site. The ground teams used GPS to obtain coordinates for a site. Greece, however, uses the EGSA87, which gives different coordinates based on Greek reference points. According to the policy of the 24th Ephorate GPS coordinates are converted to EGSA87 coordinates, which are the ones appearing on maps of the survey, when they do. The collaborative institutions, however, decided to restrict access to the coordinates as a measure to protect the sites.

The survey team began with the expectation that they would find a "countryside" supportive of the Greek city of Itanos, and it was to some degree present. They also found cultures going as far back as the Neolithic, much before the city and the Greeks, which the Greeks had supplanted. In the words of Moody and Rackham, the peninsula "is the large scale survival of a relict cultural landscape — details of Neolithic, Bronze Age (Minoan), Archaic, Classical, Hellenistic, Roman, and Byzantine Cretan lives ...." This landscape was owned by Toplou Monastery and was threatened for a time by plans made by it with a real estate company to develop parts of it in exchange for a percentage, but in 2000 the peninsula was made a Natura 2000 reservation and in 2015 Sitia Geopark. The plans were off.

A period summary of the sites found follows. Usually sequence of pottery type is the main criterion for distinguishing period, but as no excavation was performed, no exact sequences were established, and the team had to group together whatever period pottery was found together, creating periods of convenience.

Plan of the city
A number of plans and aerial views of the site are available.

Gallery

Maps

 Notes 

 Citations 

Reference bibliography
 
 
 
 
 
 
 
 
 
 
 
 
 
 
 
 
 
 
 

 External links 

 TF1 Le site archéologique d'Itanos en images
 other annual reports are available on Persée.
 E. GRECO et al., Travaux menés en collaboration avec l'Ecole française en 1996. Itanos (Crète orientale), Bulletin de Correspondance Hellénique CXXI, 1997, p. 809–824; E. GRECO et al., Travaux menés en collaboration avec l'Ecole française en 1997. Itanos (Crète orientale), Bulletin de Correspondance Hellénique CXXII, 1998, p. 585–602; Travaux menés en collaboration avec l'Ecole française en 1998. Itanos (Crète orientale), Bulletin de Correspondance Hellénique CXXIII, 1999, p. 515–530; Travaux menés en collaboration avec l'Ecole française en 1999. Itanos (Crète orientale), Bulletin de Correspondance Hellénique CXXIV, 2000, p. 547～559; Travaux menés en collaboration avec l'Ecole française en 2001. Itanos (Crète orientale)'', Bulletin de Correspondance Hellénique CXXVI, 2002, p. 577–582. 

Former populated places in Greece
Lasithi
Ancient Greek archaeological sites in Crete
Populated places in ancient Crete